On the Way Home is the diary of an American farm wife, Laura Ingalls Wilder, during her 1894 migration with her husband Almanzo Wilder and their seven-year-old daughter, Rose, from De Smet, South Dakota, to Mansfield, Missouri, where they settled permanently.

It provides a detailed, daily description of the family's migration and includes commentary by Rose ("a setting by Rose Wilder Lane"). It was published in 1962, after Laura's death, by Harper & Bros., who had published her Little House series of novels. It is sometimes considered part of the series, which is narrowly a series of eight autobiographical children's novels based on Wilder's life from about 1870 to 1894 in South Dakota, ages about three to 27.

References

Little House books
1962 non-fiction books
Children's non-fiction books
Diaries
Harper & Row books
1894 in the United States
1962 children's books
Books published posthumously